Konnichi wa is a Japanese greeting.

Konnichiwa or Konnichi wa may also refer to:

 Konichiwa Records, a Swedish record label 
 Konnichiwa (Skepta album), 2016, and its title track
 Konnichiwa (Youmou & Ohana album), 2008
 Konnichiwa, a 2003 album by Charm featuring Ailyn
 "Konnichiwa" (The Superions song), 2014 
 "Konnichiwa", a song by Shonen Knife from the 1998 album Happy Hour
 "Konnichiwa", a song by Shanadoo from the 2006 album Welcome to Tokyo
 "Konnichiwa" a 2015 song by Mike Williams

See also

 "Konichiwa Bitches", a 2007 single by Robyn
 "Kanashimi yo Konnichi wa", a 1986 song by Yuki Saito 
 Kon'nichiwa Anne: Before Green Gables, a series in the World Masterpiece Theater anime